Oskar Wackerzapp (March 12, 1883 – August 8, 1965) was a German politician of the Christian Democratic Union (CDU) and former member of the German Bundestag.

Life 
In 1949 he was elected to the German Bundestag, of which he was a member in the first legislative period until 1953.

Literature

References

1883 births
1965 deaths
Members of the Bundestag for Lower Saxony
Members of the Bundestag 1949–1953
Members of the Bundestag for the Christian Democratic Union of Germany